Gheorghe Gornea (2 August 1944 – 2005) was a Romanian football goalkeeper.

Club career
Gheorghe Gornea was born on 2 August 1944 in Sinaia, Romania and he started playing football at Carpați Sinaia, before transferring at Steaua București where he made his Divizia A debut on 30 August 1964 in a 4–0 away victory against Știința Craiova. In his second season spent at Steaua he won the Cupa României, going afterwards to play for UTA Arad where in his five years spent at the club he won two Divizia A titles, being used by coach Nicolae Dumitrescu in 30 games in the first one and in 29 matches in the second one. He also helped the team by having an appreciated performance when they eliminated the defending European Cup champions Feyenoord in the 1970–71 European Cup season, having a total of 6 appearances in the competition over the course of two seasons. Gornea went to play for one season in Divizia B at Minerul Baia Mare, afterwards transferring at CSM Reșița, being brought there by his former coach from UTA, Ioan Reinhardt, where on 11 March 1973 he made his last Divizia A appearance in a 5–1 loss against Steagul Roșu Brașov, having a total of 143 matches played in the competition, retiring after playing three more seasons at Rapid Arad in Divizia B. After he retired, Gornea struggled with alcoholism and had both of his legs amputated, dying in 2005 in his native town, Sinaia.

International career
Gheorghe Gornea played four games in which he conceded two goals at international level for Romania, all under the guidance of coach Angelo Niculescu, making his debut on 27 October 1968 when he came as a substitute at half-time and replaced Narcis Coman in a 3–0 away loss against Portugal at the 1970 World Cup qualifiers in which he conceded one goal from Jacinto Santos. His following game was a 0–0 against England, afterwards appearing in a 2–0 victory against Switzerland at the 1970 World Cup qualifiers and his last game was another friendly against England, played on the Wembley Stadium which ended 1–1 in which he had a appreciated performance, being nicknamed "The hero from Wembley". Gornea was also selected by Angelo Niculescu to be part of Romania's squad at the 1970 World Cup final tournament, but he did not play in any game there.

Honours
Steaua București
Cupa României: 1965–66
UTA Arad
Divizia A: 1968–69, 1969–70

References

External links

Romania National Team 1960–1969 – Details

1944 births
2005 deaths
Romanian footballers
Romania international footballers
1970 FIFA World Cup players
Liga I players
Liga II players
FC Steaua București players
FC UTA Arad players
CSM Reșița players
CS Minaur Baia Mare (football) players
Vagonul Arad players
Association football goalkeepers
People from Sinaia